South Shore Mall can refer to the following things:

 South Shore Plaza in Braintree, Massachusetts 
 Westfield South Shore in Bay Shore, New York (which was originally named "South Shore Mall")
 Shoppes at Riverside, formerly the South Shore Mall, in Aberdeen, Washington

See also
 South Shore (disambiguation)